Jarod is a village in Vaghodia Taluka of Vadodara district in Gujarat state of India.

Geography
It has an average elevation of 113 metres (370.64 feet).

Jarod is center of four taluka Waghodia, Savli, Halol, Vadodara all four is like same distance in four direction.
There are three Government school namely Jarod Group Kumar Shala only boys studying which is 60-70-year-old school, Kanyashala only girls studying standard 1 to 7 and Shree M P Highschool in which standard 1 to 8 is non granted & 9 to 12 is government granted. Also Private schools are Nalanda Vidhyalaya, Aroma  School.

Demographics
 India census, Jarod had a population of 6,438. Males constitute 3,361 and females are 3,077.

Transport
The usual mode of transport is state owned buses, although private buses are also a part of it, whereas for long journeys trains are preferred and the most preferred one station is Vadodara, which is approx 24 km from the village.

References

Villages in Vadodara district